The 1860 Vermont gubernatorial election for governor of Vermont was held on Tuesday, September 4. In keeping with the "Mountain Rule", incumbent Republican Hiland Hall was not a candidate for a third one-year term. The Republican nominee was former Governor Erastus Fairbanks. With the Democratic Party fracturing nationally over the slavery issue, John Godfrey Saxe, the Democratic nominee against Hall in 1859, appeared on the ballot as a supporter of Stephen A. Douglas for president. Robert Harvey appeared as a supporter of Democratic presidential candidate John C. Breckinridge.

Vermont continued to strongly oppose the continuation of slavery and its backing of the Republican Party's abolitionist platform was unwavering. Fairbanks easily defeated both Democrats to win a one-year term. He took his oath of office on October 12.

General election

Results

References 

1860
Vermont
Gubernatorial
October 1860 events